Amanita frostiana, also known as Frost's amanita, is a small fungus species of eastern U.S. and southeastern Canada. The mushroom varies in colours from  yellow, red or reddish pink usually.

Description
Some of the species' notable physical characteristics, however, distinguish it from the other members of the genus. For instance, the colors of the cap, darkening over the disk and the universal veil colored yellow to cream. The other characteristics of the other parts of its body are as follows:

 Cap : The cap is convex or sometimes shield-shaped, becoming flat with a fairly distinctly lined margin. The cap may vary in lengths of 2-8 centimeters. The colors include yellow to golden orange or a different combination of scarlet or deep reddish pink. The surface is smooth, becoming slightly sticky when moist.
 Stem/stipe : The stem, also called stipe. The universal veil material is yellow to cream, forming yellow powder or flakes at the base of the stalk. It measures 47 to 62 mm in length and 4 to 11 mm in diameter, also consisting a persistent annulus.
 Gills : The gills are free, close, and cream in mass. The short gills are truncate to excavated-truncate and are numerous.
 Spores and microscopic features : The spores measure 7.0 to 10.2 µm wide and are globose to subglobose and inamyloid. It has also been noticed that the spores of this mushroom do not turn black in color if iodine is poured on it.

Distribution and habitat 
This rare species is normally found in mixed forests with oaks (mostly Quercus oaks) and conifers (mostly Pinaceae conifers). It is considered native to eastern U.S. and southeastern Canada.

Similar species
Amanita frostiana is similar to a range of species, like Amanita rubrovolvata, Amanita flavoconia, Amanita albocreata, Amanita muscaria var. muscaria or simply Amanita muscaria and Amanita subfrostiana.

Amanita rubrovolvata is slightly similar physically to this species. The fungus produces small- to medium-sized mushrooms, with reddish-orange caps. Roger Heim reported A. frostiana as occurring in Thailand, but this was probably a misidentification of A. rubrovolvata.

Amanita subfrostiana, also referred to as 'False Frost's Amanita', has the same natural habitat as of A. frostiana, but is mostly distributed in southwestern China. It does resemble A. frostiana but due to the different paleness of color in the cap of this species helps avoid misidentification.

The distinct and starkly white bulb (e.g., 17 x 15 mm) bears a white or yellow-white collar that is somewhat similar to the collar seen in the exannulate Amanita albocreata, which is a species of the hardwood-hemlock (Tsuga) forest of the northeastern U.S. and southeastern Canada and of boreal forest at least as far north as the Island of Newfoundland.

The clamps present at bases of basidia of this species specially support the presumed relationship to Amanita muscaria var. muscaria or simply Amanita muscaria. Amanita muscaria is a poisonous and psychoactive basidiomycete fungus, one of many in the genus Amanita.

Many misidentifications have taken place while recognizing Amanita flavoconia, one of the most common and widespread species of Amanita in eastern North America, due to various similar physical characteristics. It is mostly confused due to their microscopic features.

Edibility
The species is considered inedible and poisonous.

See also
Amanita rubrovolvata
Amanita flavoconia
Amanita muscaria
Amanita albocreata
 List of Amanita species

References

External links

 List of Amanitaceae in Great Smoky Mtns National Park — Amanita frostiana
 Page in the Russian Wikipedia
 Further information about the species' name at Index Fungorum

frostiana
Fungi of Canada
Fungi of the United States
Flora of the Eastern United States
Flora of Eastern Canada
Flora of the Appalachian Mountains
Flora of the Great Lakes region (North America)
Natural history of the Great Smoky Mountains
Fungi without expected TNC conservation status